The legislature of the U.S. state of California has convened many times since statehood became effective on September 9, 1850.

Legislatures

See also
 List of governors of California
 List of speakers of the California State Assembly
 History of California

References

External links

 
 
 
 
 

Legislatures
Legislature
 
Legislatures